Yevgeni Vitalievich Davydov; born May 27, 1967) is a Russian former professional ice hockey player who played in the National Hockey League for the Winnipeg Jets, Florida Panthers and the Ottawa Senators.

Playing career
On January 4, 1987, Davydov was playing for the Soviet Union's team at the World Junior Championship. In the infamous Punch-up in Piestany,
Davydov was identified as the player who jumped the boards and caused a bench-clearing brawl. Both teams were ejected from the tournament and Canada lost an assured medal.

Davydov was drafted 235th overall by Winnipeg in the 1989 NHL Entry Draft.  After winning a gold medal as a member of the Unified Team at the 1992 Winter Olympics, he joined the Jets and went on to play in 155 regular season games, scoring 40 goals and 39 assists for 79 points, picking up 120 penalty minutes.  Between 1995 and 2003, Davydov had spells in France, Sweden, Switzerland, Finland, Germany, Italy as well as a return to Russia before hanging up his skates.

Career statistics

Regular season and playoffs

International

References

External links
 

1967 births
Living people
Berlin Capitals players
Brynäs IF players
Chicago Wolves (IHL) players
EHC Olten players
EV Zug players
Florida Panthers players
Gothiques d'Amiens players
Ak Bars Kazan players
HC CSKA Moscow players
HC Milano players
Ice hockey players at the 1992 Winter Olympics
Oulun Kärpät players
Krylya Sovetov Moscow players
Olympic gold medalists for the Unified Team
Olympic ice hockey players of the Unified Team
Ottawa Senators players
Russian ice hockey right wingers
San Diego Gulls (IHL) players
Soviet ice hockey right wingers
Traktor Chelyabinsk players
Winnipeg Jets (1979–1996) draft picks
Winnipeg Jets (1979–1996) players
Sportspeople from Chelyabinsk
Olympic medalists in ice hockey
Medalists at the 1992 Winter Olympics
Honoured Masters of Sport of the USSR